The 3rd World Congress of the Communist International (Comintern) was held in Moscow on 22 June–12 July 1921.  The third official meeting of the Communist International included delegations from more than 50 different national structures and took place in the back-drop of two major events; the failure of the German revolution and the introduction of New Economic Policy in Soviet Russia.  

The main language of the congress was German, with three further working languages: French, English and Russian (of the three, French being predominant).

Agenda
The agenda was circulated in several languages from March 1921:
 Report of the Executive Committee.
 The world economic crisis and the new rôle of the Communist International.
 Tactics of the Communist International during the revolution.
 The period of transition (partial actions and the final revolutionary struggle).
 The campaign against the Yellow Trade Union International of Amsterdam.
 The International Council of Red Trade Unions and the Communist International.
 The internal structure of the Communist Parties, their methods of action, and the essence of that action.
 The internal structure of the Communist International—and its relations with the affiliated parties.
 The Eastern question.
 The Italian Socialist Party and the Communist International. (Appeal of the Italian Socialist Party against the decision of the Executive Committee.)
 The K.A.P.D. and the Communist International. (Appeal of the V.K.P.D. against the decision of the Executive Committee.)
 The women's movement.
 The Young Communist movement.
 Election of the Executive Committee, and designation of its place of session.
 Miscellaneous.

Delegates
There were delegates from the following countries.

References

Comintern
Marxism–Leninism
1921 conferences
1921 in politics